The 1967–68 NBA season was the Warriors' 22nd season in the NBA and 6th in the San Francisco Bay Area. The Warriors entered the season hoping to improve upon their previous season output of 44-37. They failed to do so, finishing the season with a 43-39 record, but they still made the playoffs.

Roster

Regular season

Season standings

x – clinched playoff spot

Record vs. opponents

Game log

Playoffs

|- align="center" bgcolor="#ccffcc"
| 1
| March 22
| @ St. Louis
| W 111–106
| Jeff Mullins (29)
| Rudy LaRusso (17)
| Al Attles (7)
| Kiel Auditorium5,018
| 1–0
|- align="center" bgcolor="#ffcccc"
| 2
| March 23
| @ St. Louis
| L 103–111
| Jeff Mullins (33)
| Clyde Lee (10)
| Al Attles (7)
| Kiel Auditorium5,810
| 1–1
|- align="center" bgcolor="#ccffcc"
| 3
| March 26
| St. Louis
| W 124–109
| Jeff Mullins (33)
| Clyde Lee (22)
| Al Attles (7)
| Cow Palace5,136
| 2–1
|- align="center" bgcolor="#ccffcc"
| 4
| March 29
| St. Louis
| W 108–107
| Jeff Mullins (35)
| Clyde Lee (12)
| Al Attles (12)
| Oakland–Alameda County Coliseum Arena12,325
| 3–1
|- align="center" bgcolor="#ffcccc"
| 5
| March 31
| @ St. Louis
| L 103–129
| Bob Warlick (21)
| Fred Hetzel (9)
| Jim King (6)
| Kiel Auditorium4,118
| 3–2
|- align="center" bgcolor="#ccffcc"
| 6
| April 2
| St. Louis
| W 111–106
| Rudy LaRusso (30)
| Rudy LaRusso (13)
| Al Attles (9)
| Cow Palace12,905
| 4–2
|-

|- align="center" bgcolor="#ffcccc"
| 1
| April 5
| @ Los Angeles
| L 105–133
| Jeff Mullins (29)
| Clyde Lee (18)
| Jeff Mullins (5)
| The Forum10,319
| 0–1
|- align="center" bgcolor="#ffcccc"
| 2
| April 10
| @ Los Angeles
| L 112–115
| Fred Hetzel (36)
| Rudy LaRusso (15)
| Al Attles (9)
| The Forum11,270
| 0–2
|- align="center" bgcolor="#ffcccc"
| 3
| April 11
| Los Angeles
| L 124–128
| Fred Hetzel (27)
| Rudy LaRusso (13)
| Jeff Mullins (7)
| Cow Palace9,232
| 0–3
|- align="center" bgcolor="#ffcccc"
| 4
| April 13
| Los Angeles
| L 100–106
| Fred Hetzel (27)
| Clyde Lee (17)
| Jeff Mullins (6)
| Cow Palace9,623
| 0–4
|-

Awards and records
 Nate Thurmond, NBA All-Star Game

References

Golden State Warriors seasons
San Francisco
San Fran
San Fran